The Battle of Szydłowiec took place in the night of 22–23 January 1863, during the January Uprising. It began when Polish insurgents under Captain  and Colonel Marian Langiewicz attacked the town of Szydłowiec (Congress Poland), where a garrison of the Imperial Russian Army stayed.

Szydlowiec was defended by an infantry regiment under Major Rudigier. Polish insurgents attacked the town three times, but after initial successes, they were forced to retreat, losing five men. The town eventually remained in Russian hands. After retreating, Langiewicz's unit went to Wąchock.

Five insurgents were killed, several wounded, and three wounded Poles were taken prisoner by the Russians. Among the Polish casualties were high school students. Russian losses totaled 24 killed, wounded or taken prisoner.

References

Szydlowiec
Conflicts in 1863
History of Masovian Voivodeship
Radom Governorate
January 1863 events